James T. Tebbs (May 1878 – after 1901) was an English professional footballer who made 37 appearances in the Football League playing for Loughborough and Small Heath. He played as an outside left.

Tebbs was born in Melton Mowbray, Leicestershire. He played in the Second Division for Loughborough, and was the club's leading scorer – with only 4 goals out of the 18 they scored – in the 1899–1900 season, Loughborough's last in the Football League. He then joined Small Heath, but the form of Sid Wharton restricted Tebbs to four appearances in two years, and he then returned to Leicestershire to play non-league football for Leicester United.

References

1878 births
Year of death missing
Sportspeople from Melton Mowbray
Footballers from Leicestershire
English footballers
Association football forwards
Loughborough F.C. players
Birmingham City F.C. players
Leicester United F.C. players
English Football League players
Place of death missing